Springvale or Spring Vale or variant, may refer to:

Places
 Springvale Township (disambiguation)
 Springvale Airport (disambiguation)

Australia
 Springvale, New South Wales, a suburb of Wagga Wagga
 Springvale, Queensland, a locality in the Western Downs Region
 Springvale, Victoria, a suburb of Melbourne
 Springvale railway station
 Springvale Station, a pastoral lease in the Kimberley region of Western Australia
 Springvale, Western Australia, the location of Springvale Airport
 Electoral district of Springvale, Victoria

Canada
 Springvale, Haldimand County, Ontario
 Springvale, Lambton County, Ontario
 West Royalty-Springvale, PEI; an electoral district
 Springvale Aerodrome, Ontario; an airport

United Kingdom

Northern Ireland
 Springvale, County Down, a townland in County Down, Northern Ireland

Scotland
 Springvale Park, Glasgow

England
 Spring Vale, West Midlands
 Spring Vale railway station, a former rail station serving the community of Spring Vale in Darwen, Lancashire

United States
 Springvale, Georgia
 Springvale, Maine
 Spring Vale, Michigan
 Springvale, Columbia County, Wisconsin
 Springvale, Fond du Lac County, Wisconsin

Other uses
 Springvale Secondary College, Victoria, Australia
 Springvale House, a private preparatory school in Mashonaland East, Zimbabwe

See also

 Springvale Formation, Trinidad and Tobago
 Springvale Junction, a road junction in Melbourne, Victoria
 Springvale Bypass, a bypass in Melbourne, Victoria
 Springvale South, Victoria, Australia
 South Springvale SC, a soccer team from Springvale, Melbourne, Victoria, Australia
 Springvale Botanical Cemetery, Victoria, Australia
 Spring Vale Cemetery railway line, Victoria, Australia
 Spring Vale Cemetery railway station